Burrage is an English surname. It is similar to Burridge. Notable people with the surname include: 

 Albert Burrage (1859–1931), American industrialist and philanthropist
 A. M. Burrage (1889–1956), British writer
 Barbara Burrage (1900–1989), American printmaker
 Clare Burrage, British particle physicist
 Harold Burrage (1931–1966), American blues and soul musician
 Henry Sweetser Burrage (1837–1926), American clergyman and historian
 Jodie Burrage (born 1999), British tennis player 
 Luke Burrage (born 1980), British entertainer and author
 Michael Burrage (born 1950), American judge
 Mildred Burrage (1890–1983), American artist
 Nathan Burrage (born 1971), Australian author
 Roland Burrage Dixon (1875–1934), American anthropologist
 Ronnie Burrage (born 1959), American jazz drummer
 Sean Burrage (born 1968), American politician
 Steve Burrage (born 1952), American politician

Things named after Burrages include:
 Burrage Dome, a large ice dome northeast of Mount Joyce in Antarctica
 Burrage Pond Wildlife Management Area in Hanson & Halifax, Massachusetts
 Burrage Road, running through the London suburbs of Plumstead and Woolwich
 Burrage v. United States, a U.S. Supreme Court case

See also
 Burridge (surname)
 Burbridge
Burr

Surnames
English-language surnames
Surnames of English origin
Surnames of British Isles origin